Durga Charan Banerjee (1898-1952) was a Bengali-speaking Indian jurist and a member of parliament of the first Lok Sabha.

Early life and education
He was born to Anukul Charan Banerjee in Midnapore in January, 1898. He was educated at the Midnapore College and at the Scottish Church College. Later he studied criminal law at the University of Calcutta. He married Triguna Debi in April 1913.

Career
He had started out as a criminal lawyer. Later he served on the panel of public prosecutors. He had also worked as the Municipal Commissioner for the Midnapore municipality in  1921. Later he worked as the manager of the Diamond Amateur Theatre in Midnapore. He was related with the activities of the Ramakrishna Mission, Sebashram and hospital in Midnapore.

He was elected from the formerly named Lok Sabha constituency of Midnapore-Jhargram in the first Lok Sabha elections in 1952 as a candidate for the Bharatiya Jana Sangh.

References

1898 births
1952 deaths
India MPs 1952–1957
19th-century Bengalis
20th-century Bengalis
Scottish Church College alumni
University of Calcutta alumni
Lok Sabha members from West Bengal
People from Midnapore
Bharatiya Jana Sangh politicians